Salman Husaini Nadwi (born 1954), is an Indian scholar and professor in the Islamic sciences. He is an author of numerous scholarly works in Arabic and Urdu. Salman Nadwi served as the Dean of the Faculty of Dawah at the Darul-uloom Nadwatul Ulama madrasa in Lucknow.

He serves as the chairman of the Dr. Abdul Ali Unani Medical College and Hospital, Chancellor of Darul Uloom Syed Ahmad Shaheed – Katoli, President of Jamiat Shabaab ul Islam. In addition, he is a founding member of numerous medical, IT and engineering colleges in India. Salman Nadwi is also the editor and co-editor of thirteen different periodicals in English, Urdu, Persian and Arabic languages published in India and abroad.

Early life and education
Salman Nadwi was born in 1954, in the city of Lucknow. His lineage can be traced back to Muhammad through Husayn ibn Ali. His mother is the niece of the Indian Islamic scholar Abul Hasan Ali Hasani Nadwi, from whom Salman Nadwi benefited greatly.

He began his elementary education at a branch school of Darul-uloom Nadwatul Ulama where he memorised the Qur'an at an early age. After completing a middle school level education of Islamic studies, he matriculated to a graduate program at the college of Shari'ah and Usul al-Din in Darul Uloom Nadwatul Ulama. After graduation in 1974, he, alongside a group of other graduates, established the Jam'iat Shabab al-Islam (Organization of the Youth of Islam), an organisation that is considered today to be one of the largest and most active Islamic organisations in India.

He completed a master's degree in Hadith (al-Hadith al-Sharif wa 'Ulumuhu) from Darul Uloom Nadwatul Ulama in 1976. A year later, he was admitted into the college of Usul al-Din at the Imam Muhammad ibn Saud Islamic University and continued to pursue higher education in the field of Hadith. He received his master's degree in Hadith studies with high recognition in 1980. His dissertation, Jam' Alfaz al-Jarh wa 'l-Ta'dil wa Dirasatuha min Kitab Tahdhib al-Tahdhib li 'l-Hafiz Ibn Hajar, was completed under the supervision of the erudite hadith and usul scholar, 'Abd al-Fattah Abu Ghuddah. Husaini benefited heavily from Abu Ghuddah in the field of hadith studies during his stay at the Jami'ah and was amongst his most distinguished and beloved students.

Career

He has written books in Arabic and Urdu. Husaini served as the Dean of the Faculty of Dawah at the Darul-uloom Nadwatul Ulama madrasa in Lucknow.

He contributed to the establishment of the Madrasat al-Imam Ahmad ibn 'Irfan al-Shahid al-Islamiyyah in 1975.

Sunni Muslim army

On July 2014, Firstpost reported that Husaini wrote a letter to the Saudi government offering to raise a 500,000 strong militia of Sunni Muslim Indian youth that would be a part of a powerful global Islamic army. The army, he proposed, would fight Shia militants in Iraq, would "help Muslims in need" elsewhere and would become part of a Caliphate that he wants Saudis to set up for the Muslim ummah, the international Muslim community.

See also
 Rabey Hasani Nadvi
 Abul Hasan Ali Hasani Nadwi
 Syed Sulaiman Nadvi

References

External links
Jamiat Shabab al Islam, Lucknow,india 
Islamic Fiqh Academy, India
Muslim World League

1954 births
Living people
Scholars from Lucknow
Indian Sunni Muslim scholars of Islam
Urdu-language writers
Hanafis
Deobandis
Nadwatul Ulama